Alenka Pirjevec is a puppeteer, theatre director and actress from Slovenia.

Early life and education 
Alenka Pirjevec was born on 5 July 1945 in Ljubljana, Slovenia, to Slovenian partisan, literary historian and philosopher Dušan Pirjevec and his wife, partisan co-fighter and university professor of the French language, Marjeta Vasič.

She attended primary school and classical gymnasium in Ljubljana where she graduated in 1964 and enrolled in the Academy of Theatre, Radio, Film and Television (AGRFT) in the department for play and theatre in 1965, where she finished three years and transferred for the fourth year to the Academy of Theatre in Belgrade and graduated with a diploma in 1969.

Career 
She continued living in Belgrade working part-time as an actress in the national theatre while also working as a translator from Slovene to Serbo-Croatian until 1973 when she returned to Ljubljana.

Upon return, she started working in the Puppet Theatre of Ljubljana in 1975 as actress and animator where she still works at (as of 2020). She held the position of artistic director in the seasons 1987/88 and 1988/89.

Falling in love with puppets she asked her senior to teach her animating puppets and performing with them. In spring of 1984, Alenka received a scholarship of the theatre and attended a six-week course named "Théâtre d'objets" under the guidance of Josef Krofta in the Institut International de la Marionnette in Charleville-Mézières, France.

In the season 1991/92 she received a scholarship from the ministry of culture in Slovenia and attended the international specialised course in technology of puppet creation in the National School Supérieure Des Arts De La Marionnette (ESNAM) in Charleville-Mézières, France.

In October 2020 she completed her master's degree at AGRFT titled "The Invisible Space between Puppet and Puppeteer" and has since been working in the following departments: drama play and puppet animation, puppet directing, puppet dramaturgy, teaching puppet animation, artistic design of the puppet show, production of puppets including sculptural work from various materials (wood, polyester resin, styrofoam, foam rubber), sewing, crocheting, knitting, bobbin-making.

References 

1945 births
Living people
Puppeteers